4-AcO-MiPT (4-acetoxy-N-methyl-N-isopropyltryptamine or mipracetin) is a psychedelic tryptamine.  It is closely related to O-acetylpsilocin and MiPT.

There is very little information on the human pharmacology or toxicity of 4-AcO-MiPT, although analytical methods have been developed for its detection.

Drug prohibition laws

Sweden
Sveriges riksdags health ministry Statens folkhälsoinstitut classified 4-AcO-MiPT as "health hazard" under the act Lagen om förbud mot vissa hälsofarliga varor (translated Act on the Prohibition of Certain Goods Dangerous to Health) as of Nov 1, 2005,  in their regulation SFS 2005:733 listed as 4-acetoxi-N,N-metylisopropyltryptamin (4-AcO-MIPT), making it illegal to sell or possess.

References

External links
Erowid 4-AcO-MiPT Vault
Erowid's online version of TiHKAL, a book about Tryptamines

Acetate esters
Entheogens
Psychedelic tryptamines
Designer drugs